The Hollandale School District is a public school district based in Hollandale, Mississippi (USA).

In addition to Hollandale, the district also serves the town of Arcola.

The superintendent for 2022 is Dr. Mario Willis.

Schools
 Simmons Junior-Senior High School
 Sanders Elementary School

Demographics

2006-07 school year
There were a total of 841 students enrolled in the Hollandale School District during the 2006–2007 school year. The gender makeup of the district was 50% female and 50% male. The racial makeup of the district was 99.17% African American, 0.36% White, and 0.48% Hispanic. All of the district's students were eligible to receive free lunch.

Previous school years

Accountability statistics

See also
List of school districts in Mississippi

References

External links

Education in Washington County, Mississippi
School districts in Mississippi